Saeed Akef (born 1972) is an Iranian author and memoir writer who often writes about the Iran–Iraq War. His books have been one of the most widely published books about that war. Borunsi (2004) has been reprinted more than 200 times since its first edition, and is amongst the bestselling books in Iran. Nasime Taghdir (Breeze of Destiny) has been a nominee in the 10th Holy Defense Year Book Award.

Life and careers
Saeed Akef was born in Tehran in 1972. He completed his primary education in Tehran. After a while he became interested in the field of religious studies and therefore immigrated to Mashhad to continue his studies. He was deployed to the front at the end year of the Iran–Iraq War and spent about three months there. He spent his teenage years practicing writing. Akef began writing small articles for newspapers. Since 1985, he encouraged his writing skills by participating in storytelling and story criticism classes. After the war, he became interested in writing about the war and began writing biographies of martyrs. After some time working in the field of the Iran–Iraq War, Akef established a publishing house and entered the publishing industry. He has published dozens of books so far, some of which have received awards.

Bibliography
Most of Akef's books are about the Iran–Iraq War. Some of these are multi-volume books.
 Hekayate Zemestan (title means The story of winter), 1990
 KhakHaye Narme Kushk (the soft soils of Kushk), published in English as Borunsi), 1999
 Arvand va Khatereye Avvalin Ghayeq (title means Arvand and the memory of the first boat), 2000
 Sakenane Molke Azam (title means Residents of the Grand Estate), 2006
 Jaye Khalie Khakriz (title means Embankment vacancy), 2008
 Mosaferane Malakoot (title means The Heavenly Travelers), 2006
 Hajar dar Entezar (title means Hajar in Waiting), 2009
 Raghs dar Dele Atash (title means Dance In The Heart Of Fire), 2000
 Nasime Taghdir (title means Breeze of Destiny), 2003
 Khaterate Shegoft (title means Wonderful memories), 2013
 Yadegaran: Ketabe Naseri (title means The Keepers: Book of Naseri), 2008
 Bazme Baran (title means Banquet of the rain), 2018
 Gomshodeye Mazar Sharif (title means The Lost in Mazar-i-Sharif), 2016
 In Sardare Asemani: Khaterate Sardare Shahid Habib Lakzayi (title means This Heavenly Commander: Memoirs of Martyr Habib Lakzayi), 2017
 Ziarate Sharife Ale Yasin: Raveshe Jame Barghararie Ertebat ba Mola Sahebaz Zaman (AJ) be Amr va Dastoore Khodeshan (title means Honorable Ale-Yasin Pilgrimage: Comprehensive way of communicating with Mullah Saheb Zaman on his own orders), 2016
 Ketabe Shahid Amirabbasi (title means The Book of Martyr Amirabbasi), 2014
 Osveha: Shahid Kaveh (title means Exemplars: Martyr Kaveh), 2005
 SarvQamatane Javdaneh "Yadvareye Farmandehan va Modirane Shahide Amoozeshe Sepah", "Vijeye Ostane Khorasan" (title means The Eternal Cedar statures "Commemoration of the Martyrs Commanders and Managers of Sepah training", "Special to Khorasan Province"), 2004
 Kelide Fathe Bostan (title means The key to conquering Bostan), 2003
 Az Akharin Savarane Ill "Majmooe Khaterate Shahid Naseri" (title means From the last riders of the tribe "Martyr Naseri Memories Collection"), 2003
 Shame Barfi (authors: Mohammad Mahmoudi Nourabadi and Saeed Akef, title means The Snow Dinner), 2015

Awards
Akef's book Nasime Taghdir (Breeze of Destiny) was one of the top selected books of the 10th Holy Defense Year Book Award in 2006. It also won third place in the Oral Memories section of the same festival.

Translated book
Akef's book KhakHaye Narme Kushk (the soft soils of Kushk), has been translated into English, Arabic and Urdu. The English translation has been published under the English title Borunsi. The Urdu translation has been published under the Urdu title Goodbye Baba in India.

See also
 Majid Gheisari
 Ahad Gudarziani
 Masoumeh Abad
 Ahmad Dehqan
 Akbar Sahraee
 Nasrollah Mardani
 Morteza Avini
 Tahereh Saffarzadeh
 Seyyed Mahdi Shojaee
 Mohammad Doroudian
 Hamid Reza Shekarsari

References

External links
 Saeed Akef Books on Goodreads
 Saeed Akef Books on Gisoom
 News about Saeed Akef in Persian on Mehr News Agency
 News about Saeed Akef in Persian on Tasnim News Agency
 Documentary film created from Borunsi book
 A photo report of meeting with Saeed Akef

1972 births
Living people
Iranian male writers
Writers from Tehran
Persian-language writers
Recipients of the Holy Defense Year Book Award
Iranian memoirists
Iranian publishers (people)